Nirnayam is a 1995 Indian Malayalam-language crime thriller film directed by Sangeeth Sivan, produced by Suresh Balaje, and written by Cheriyan Kalpakavadi. The film stars Mohanlal and Heera Rajagopal. The plot follows a physician who has been falsely accused for his wife's murder escapes from the custody to discover the truth behind the incident and the actual perpetrators. The film's music was composed by R. Anandh.

The plot is heavily based on the American film The Fugitive, which itself is based on the 1963 TV Series of the same name.

Plot

Dr. Roy is an honest surgeon who works in a private hospital. He falls in love with his apprentice Dr. Annie and marries her. When Annie discovers a frightening organ-smuggling operation in her hospital, she is murdered. Dr. Roy is framed for the crime due to circumstantial evidence. However, on his way to jail, an accident occurs and he escapes. A fugitive from justice, he tries to discover the truth. He eventually finds aid in a police officer, Javed. Eventually, Dr. Roy is able to bring the perpetrators behind the kidney scam to justice and kill Ifti, his wife's murderer.

Cast
 Mohanlal as Dr. Roy Mathews
 Heera Rajagopal as Dr. Annie
 Baby Shamili as Parukkutty
 Nedumudi Venu as Fr. Thayyil
 Lalu Alex as Commissioner M. Javed Khan
 Jagadish as Dr. V. D. Iyer
 M. G. Soman as Dr. David Kurishinkal
 Sharat Saxena as Ifti, the killer
 Ratheesh as Dr. Marcose
 Devan as Dr. Menon
 Sudheer as Adv. Rajendran 
 Kuthiravattom Pappu as Kunjachan, Dr. Roy's Servant
 Sukumari as Annie's Mother
 Ragini as Dr. Subbu Ammal
 Seetha as Dr. Parvathi
 Thampi Kannanthanam as Satheeshan, Police officer
 Augustine as Kunjootan, Police officer
 Nandhu as Rajan, Police officer
 Sadiq as Anil, Police officer
 Ajith Kollam as Peethambaran, the fugitive prisoner
 Geetha Vijayan as Doctor Anusree
 Maria as Devika Rani

Soundtrack
The film score and soundtrack of the film were composed by R. Anandh, a prolific composer of advertisement films.
 "Malar Masam" - M. G. Sreekumar - 4:59
 "Puliyanga Kolam" - M.G. Sreekumar - 4:31
 "En Mizhikkullil" (Only in Audio) - K. S. Chithra - 5:30
 "En Mizhikkullil" (Only in Audio) - M.G. Sreekumar - 5:30

Reception 
The Indian Express praised the film writing: "The Sivan brothers’ team of director and cameraman combine to make a technically efficient thriller taking its cue from the film version of the television series The Fugitive."

References

External links
 

1990s Malayalam-language films
1995 films
1995 crime drama films
1995 crime thriller films
Films about organ trafficking
Films about miscarriage of justice
Medical-themed films
Indian remakes of American films
Films directed by Sangeeth Sivan